Steven Earl Jones (born March 25, 1949) is an American physicist. Among scientists, Jones became known for his research into muon-catalyzed fusion and geo-fusion. Jones is also known for his association with 9/11 conspiracy theories. Jones has claimed that mere airplane crashes and fires could not have resulted in so rapid and complete a fall of the World Trade Center Towers and 7 World Trade Center, suggesting controlled demolition instead.  In late 2006, some time after Brigham Young University (BYU) officials placed him on paid leave, he elected to retire in an agreement with BYU. Jones continued research and writing following his early retirement from BYU, including a paper published in Europhysics News in August 2016.

Education
Jones earned his bachelor's degree in physics, magna cum laude, from Brigham Young University in 1973, and his Ph.D. in physics from Vanderbilt University in 1978. From 1974 to 1977, Jones conducted his PhD research at the Stanford Linear Accelerator Center (SLAC), and post-doctoral research at Cornell University and the Los Alamos Meson Physics Facility.

Research interests
Jones conducted research at the Idaho National Laboratory, in Idaho Falls, Idaho where, from 1979 to 1985, he was a senior engineering specialist. He was principal investigator for experimental muon-catalyzed fusion from 1982 to 1991 for the United States Department of Energy (DOE), Division of Advanced Energy Projects. From 1985 to 1993, Jones studied deuterium-based fusion in the context of condensed matter physics under DOE and Electric Power Research Institute sponsorship. Jones also collaborated in experiments at other physics laboratories, including TRIUMF (Vancouver, British Columbia), LANL (Los Alamos, NM), KEK (Tsukuba, Japan), and the Rutherford Appleton Laboratory near Oxford University.

Around 1985, Jones  became interested in anomalous concentrations of helium-3 and tritium found in gases escaping from volcanoes. He hypothesized that metals and high pressures in the Earth's interior might make fusion more likely, and began a series of experiments on what he referred to as geo-fusion, or piezofusion, high-pressure fusion. To characterize the reactions, Jones designed and constructed a neutron counter that was capable of accurately measuring minuscule numbers of neutrons produced in his experiments. The counter indicated that a small amount of fusion was occurring. Jones claimed that the results indicate that fusion is at least possible, although the process was unlikely to be useful as an energy source.

Jones' interests extend to archaeometry, solar energy,
and, like numerous professors at BYU, archaeology and the Book of Mormon. He has interpreted archaeological evidence from the ancient Mayans as supporting his faith's belief that Jesus Christ (when resurrected) visited America. Jones is a member of the Church of Jesus Christ of Latter-day Saints and has been described as "a devout Mormon." In 2016-17, he and his wife served as full-time Senior Missionaries in the New Jersey Morristown Mission of the Church.

Muon-catalyzed fusion
In the mid-1980s, Jones and other BYU scientists worked on what he referred to as Cold Nuclear Fusion in a Scientific American article (the process is currently known as muon-catalyzed fusion to avoid confusion with the cold fusion concept proposed by the University of Utah's Stanley Pons and Martin Fleischmann). Muon-catalyzed fusion was a field of some interest during the 1980s as a potential energy source; however, its low energy output appears to be unavoidable (because of alpha-muon sticking losses). Jones led a research team that, in 1986, achieved 150 fusions per muon (average), releasing over 2,600 MeV of fusion energy per muon, a record which still stands.

Pons and Fleischmann commenced their work at approximately the same time. Jones became aware of their work when they applied for research funding from the DOE, after which the DOE forwarded their proposal  to Jones for peer review. When Jones realized that their work was  similar, he and Pons and Fleischmann agreed to release their papers to Nature on the same day (March 24, 1989). However, Pons and Fleischmann announced their results at a press event the day before Jones faxed his paper to Nature.

According to a New York Times report, although peer reviewers were harshly critical of Pons' and Fleischmann's research, they did not apply such criticism to Jones' significantly more modest, theoretically supported findings. Critics insisted that Jones' results were probably caused by experimental error, the majority of the reviewing physicists claimed that he was a careful scientist. Later research and experiments have supported Jones' metallic "cold fusion" (geo-fusion) reports.

In July 2013, Jones gave a poster talk at the 18th International Conference on Condensed Matter Nuclear Science at the University of Missouri, titled, "Empirical Evidence for Two Distinct Effects: Low-level d-d Fusion in Metals and Anomalous Excess Heat."

9/11 conspiracy theories

World Trade Center destruction
On September 22, 2005, Jones presented his views on the collapse of the World Trade Center towers and World Trade Center 7 during the September 11 attacks in 2001 at a BYU seminar attended by around 60 people. Jones claimed that a variety of evidence defies the mainstream collapse theory and favors controlled demolition, using thermite. The evidence Jones cited included the speed and symmetry of the collapses, and characteristics of dust jets. Later, Jones said he had identified grey/red flakes found in the dust as nanothermite traces and that the thermite reaction products (aluminium oxide and iron-rich microspheres) were also found in the dust. He called for further scientific investigation to test the controlled demolition theory and the release of all relevant data by the government. Shortly after the seminar, Jones placed a research paper entitled "Why Indeed Did the WTC Buildings Collapse?" on his page in the Physics department Web site, commenting that BYU had no responsibility for the paper.

Jones subsequently presented the WTC research in lectures at Idaho State University, Utah Valley State College, University of Colorado at Boulder and University of Denver, the Utah Academy of Science, Sonoma State University, University of California at Berkeley and Davis, and the University of Texas at Austin.

On September 7, 2006, Jones removed his paper from BYU's website at the request of administrators and was placed on paid leave. The university cited its concern about the "increasingly speculative and accusatory nature" of Jones' work and that perhaps Jones' research had "not been published in appropriate scientific venues" as reasons for putting him under review. The review was to have been conducted at three levels: BYU administration, the College of Physical and Mathematical Sciences, and the Physics Department. However, BYU discontinued the review. Some of Jones' colleagues also defended Jones' 9/11 work to varying degrees, and Project Censored lists his 9/11 research among the top mainstream media censored stories of 2007.

Jones' placement on paid leave drew criticism from the American Association of University Professors and the Foundation for Individual Rights in Education. Both organizations have long been critics of BYU's record on academic freedom. Jones "welcomed the review" because he hoped it would "encourage people to read his paper for themselves," however the school abandoned the review and Jones elected to retire, effective January 1, 2007.

Jones has been interviewed by mainstream news sources and has made a number of public appearances. Jones has urged caution in drawing conclusions. In one interview, Jones directly called into question the government's theory regarding the attacks and subsequent uncharacteristic total destruction of the buildings, stating that "we don't believe that 19 hijackers and a few others in a cave in Afghanistan pulled this off acting alone". His name is often mentioned in reporting about 9/11 conspiracy theories.

Jones has published several papers suggesting that the World Trade Center was demolished with explosives, but his 2005 paper, "Why Indeed Did the WTC Buildings Collapse?" was his first paper on the topic and was considered controversial both for its content and its claims to scientific rigor. Jones' early critics included members of BYU's engineering faculty; shortly after he made his views public, the BYU College of Physical and Mathematical Sciences and the faculty of structural engineering issued statements in which they distanced themselves from Jones' work. They noted that Jones' "hypotheses and interpretations of evidence were being questioned by scholars and practitioners," and expressed doubts on whether they had been "submitted to relevant scientific venues that would ensure rigorous technical peer review." Jones further presented and defended his research before peers at the Utah Academy of Sciences, Arts and Letters on 7 April 2006 at nearby Snow College.
Jones maintained that the paper was peer-reviewed prior to publication. The paper was published in the online Journal of 9/11 Studies, a journal co-founded and co-edited by Jones for the purpose of "covering the whole of research related to 9/11/2001." The paper also appeared in a volume of essays, 9/11 and American Empire: Intellectuals Speak Out, edited by David Ray Griffin and Peter Dale Scott.

In April 2008, Jones, along with four other authors, published a letter in The Bentham Open Civil Engineering Journal, titled, 'Fourteen Points of Agreement with Official Government Reports on the World Trade Center Destruction'. In August 2008, Jones, along with Kevin Ryan and James Gourley, published a peer-reviewed article in The Environmentalist, titled, 'Environmental anomalies at the World Trade Center: Evidence for energetic materials'.

In April 2009, Jones, along with Niels H. Harrit and 7 other authors published a paper in The Open Chemical Physics Journal, titled, 'Active Thermitic Material Discovered in Dust from the 9/11 World Trade Center Catastrophe'. The editor of the journal, Professor Marie-Paule Pileni, an expert in explosives and nano-technology, resigned. She received an e-mail from the Danish science journal Videnskab asking for her professional assessment of the article's content. According to Pileni, the article was published without her authorization. Subsequently, numerous concerns arose regarding the reliability of the publisher, Bentham Science Publishers. This included the publishing an allegedly peer reviewed article generated by SCIgen (although this program has also successfully submitted papers to IEEE and Springer), the resignation of multiple people at the administrative level, and soliciting article submissions from researchers in unrelated fields through spam. With regard to the peer review process of the research conducted by Jones in The Open Chemical Physics Journal, David Griscom identified himself as one of the reviewers. The paper which Jones co-authored referenced Griscom, and multiple scientists studying 9/11, in the acknowledgements for "elucidating discussions and encouragements". Almost four years prior to identifying himself as a reviewer and the welcome he received from Jones for speaking out boldly, Griscom published a letter in defense of evidence-based 9/11 studies; of which Jones was an editor.

Europhysics News, in August 2016, published a feature "15 Years Later:  On the Physics of High-rise Building Collapses," which strongly challenges the official U.S. Government (NIST) narrative of the collapse of WTC7 and the WTC Towers, including a disclaimer about the speculative and not peer reviewed status of the article. The paper was authored by Steven Jones, Robert Korol, Anthony Szamboti and Ted Walter.

Scholars for 9/11 Truth and Scholars for 9/11 Truth & Justice
Jones was a founding member of Scholars for 9/11 Truth for approximately one year as co-chair with James H. Fetzer. From mid-November 2006 until the end of that year, Jones, Fetzer and a series of other researchers and individuals engaged in a dispute about the direction of the organization. Jones and others examined the claims of James Fetzer and Judy Wood — i.e., that directed energy weapons or mini-nukes destroyed the WTC Towers — and delineated empirical reasons for rejecting them.

Jones was co-chair of Scholars for 9/11 Truth until December 5, 2006, when he resigned his membership. In December 2006, Steven Jones and about 4/5ths of the members voted to leave the Scholars for 9/11 Truth organization to establish Scholars for 9/11 Truth & Justice. Also in 2006, Jones became a founding member of Architects & Engineers for 9/11 Truth.

While Jones is not a committee member of Scholars for 9/11 Truth & Justice, his work is supported and documented by the group. By April 2010, that organization had grown to over 800 members. He is co-editor of Journal of 9/11 Studies.

Recognition and awards
 1968, David O. McKay Scholarship at BYU; National Merit Scholar
 1973–1978 Tuition Scholarship and Research Fellowship at Vanderbilt University
 1989 Outstanding Young Scholar Award (BYU); Best of What's New for 1989 (Popular Science); Creativity Prize (Japanese Creativity Society)
 1990 BYU Young Scholar Award; Annual Lecturer, BYU Chapter of Sigma Xi
 2005 BYU Alcuin Award and Fellowship, for excellence in teaching

References

External links
 BYU energy research 
 Brookings.com - 'Cold Fusion'
 The BYU Solar Funnel Cooker/Cooler and Solar Cooker on Project Gutenberg
 Physicist Challenges Official 9-11 Story - 'Top 25 Censored Stories of 2007,' Project Censored, Nov 2006.
 Podcast of WTC demolition debate between engineer Leslie Robertson and physicist Steven Jones on KGNU radio, Oct 26, 2006.
 Analysis of the World Trade Center Destruction by Steven Jones, video recording of the one-day conference "Lifting the fog: the scientific method applied to the world trade center disaster" held at the University of California, Berkeley Campus, November 11, 2006.

Links covering Steven Jones' Cold Fusion research
 Infinite Energy Magazine article covering Cold Fusion with mention of Jones' contributions
 WIRED Magazine article covering Cold Fusion with mention of Jones' contributions

Links covering Steven Jones' 9/11 research
 Scholars For 9/11 Truth & Justice
 'Why Indeed Did the WTC Buildings Collapse?' by Steven E. Jones
 'Answers to Objections and Questions' PDF presentation by Steven E. Jones
 
 'Fourteen Points of Agreement with Official Government Reports on the World Trade Center Destruction', by Steven E. Jones, Frank M. Legge, Kevin R. Ryan, Anthony F. Szamboti, & James R. Gourley. The Open Civil Engineering Journal, Volume 2, Issue 1, pp. 35–40.
 'Active Thermitic Material Discovered in Dust from the 9/11 World Trade Center Catastrophe', by Niels H. Harrit, Jeffrey Farrer, Steven E. Jones, Kevin R. Ryan, Frank M. Legge, Daniel Farnsworth, Gregg Roberts, James R. Gourley, Bradley R. Larsen. The Open Chemical Physics Journal, Volume 2, pp. 7–31.

1949 births
21st-century American physicists
Brigham Young University alumni
Vanderbilt University alumni
Cornell University alumni
Brigham Young University faculty
American conspiracy theorists
Living people
9/11 conspiracy theorists